Sans rival is a Filipino dessert cake made of layers of buttercream, meringue and chopped cashews. Its name means "unrivaled” in French. The cake may be decorated, left plain or garnished with pistachios.

The cake's origins are disputed. One source claims the recipe has its roots in the French dacquoise, while Lucy Torres Gomez, writing in The Philippine Star, claims that the cake is descended from the tarta imperial rusa, the Spanish adaptation of a Russian cake that was popular with the Russian Imperial Family.

A similar, smaller version of this recipe is called a silvana.

See also

Mango float
Crema de fruta
Ube cheesecake
List of cakes

References

Philippine desserts
Cashew dishes
Layer cakes